Metopilio is a genus of harvestmen in the family Sclerosomatidae from Mexico and Central America.

Species
 Metopilio acanthipes (F.O.Pickard-Cambridge, 1905)
 Metopilio albispinulatus C.J.Goodnight & M.L.Goodnight, 1944
 Metopilio armatus C.J.Goodnight & M.L.Goodnight, 1953
 Metopilio armigerus (F.O.Pickard-Cambridge, 1905)
 Metopilio australis (Banks, 1909)
 Metopilio cambridgei Mello-Leitão, 1944 [= Renamed Metopilio horridus (F.O.Pickard-Cambridge, 1905)]
 Metopilio cyaneus Roewer, 1956b
 Metopilio diazi C.J.Goodnight & M.L.Goodnight, 1945
 Metopilio foveolatus Roewer, 1956
 Metopilio gertschi (Roewer, 1956)
 Metopilio hispidus Roewer, 1915
 Metopilio horridus (F.O.Pickard-Cambridge, 1905)
 Metopilio maculatipes (F.O.Pickard-Cambridge, 1905)
 Metopilio mexicanus (Roewer, 1956)
 Metopilio multispinulatus C.J.Goodnight & M.L.Goodnight, 1944
 Metopilio niger C.J.Goodnight & M.L.Goodnight, 1942
 Metopilio ornatipes (Banks, 1909)
 Metopilio spinigerus F.O.Pickard-Cambridge, 1905
 Metopilio spinulatus (Banks, 1898)

References

Harvestmen
Harvestman genera